Alfred and Martha Jane Thompson House and Williams Barn is a historic home located near New Hope, Wilson County, North Carolina.  It was built in approximately 1895, and is a one-story, three bay, frame double-pile dwelling with Greek Revival and Italianate style design elements.  It is sheathed in weatherboard and has a brick pier foundation and an engaged front porch.  The property also contains a gambrel roofed barn built about 1930.

It was listed on the National Register of Historic Places in 2002.

References

Houses on the National Register of Historic Places in North Carolina
Greek Revival houses in North Carolina
Italianate architecture in North Carolina
Houses completed in 1895
Houses in Wilson County, North Carolina
National Register of Historic Places in Wilson County, North Carolina